Hrastovica is a village north of Mokronog in the Municipality of Mokronog-Trebelno in southeastern Slovenia. It lies in the historical region of Lower Carniola. The municipality is now included in the Southeast Slovenia Statistical Region.

Landmarks
The local church in the settlement is dedicated to Saint Roch and belongs to the Parish of Mokronog. It was built in 1661. A single-arch stone bridge, built in the 19th century, leads across Jeseniščica Creek west of the church. Zagorica Manor from the end of the 17th century or the beginning of the 18th century stands northeast of the church.

References

External links

Hrastovica on Geopedia

Populated places in the Municipality of Mokronog-Trebelno